Route 366 is a collector road in the Canadian province of Nova Scotia.

It is located in Cumberland County and connects East Amherst at Trunk 6 with Port Howe on Trunk 6.

At Tidnish Bridge the road connects to Route 970 at inter-provincial boundary with New Brunswick.

Communities
East Amherst
Tyndal Road
Tidnish Bridge
Tidnish Cross Roads
Lorneville
Amherst Shore
Northport
East Linden
Linden
Port Howe

History

The entirety of the Collector Highway 366 was once designated as the Trunk Highway 66.

See also
List of Nova Scotia provincial highways

References

Nova Scotia provincial highways
Roads in Cumberland County, Nova Scotia